Molano is an Italian surname that first appeared in Messina (Sicilian: Missina; Latin: Messana), the capital of the Italian province of Messina. Its history begins in 397 BC. After a turbulent history, they conquered the Saracens in 831 and the Normans in 1061. In 1190, she presided over the Crusades. Garibaldi landed in 1860 and was the last city to become part of a unified Italy. In those ancient times, only nobles, Podestas, clergymen, city officials, military officers, artists, and landowners were recorded in the records. Being recorded at this time, at the dawn of recorded history, is in itself a great distinction and a sign of noble blood.

 Alex Molano (born 1992), American professional soccer player
 Diego Molano Aponte (born 1970), Colombian politician and business administrator
 Diego Molano Vega (born 1967), former Minister of Information Technologies and Communications of Colombia
 Juan Minaya Molano (born 1941), Colombian chess master
 Ericson Alexander Molano (born 1979), Spanish Christian singer
 Juan Sebastián Molano (born 1994), Colombian professional racing cyclist
 Willie Molano, retired Colombian association football player

See also

References 

Surnames of Italian origin
Italian-language surnames
Spanish-language surnames